The  was a sleeper train service operated in Japan by Kyushu Railway Company (JR Kyushu), which ran from Kyoto to Kumamoto, passing through Osaka, Okayama, Kokura, and Hakata. It once extended to Nishi-Kagoshima.

The Naha was coupled to the Akatsuki between Kyoto Station and Tosu Station.

Due to falling passenger numbers, both the Naha and Akatsuki services ceased following the March 15, 2008, timetable revision.

Schedule
Timetable of Naha, as of March 2008 before its discontinuation:

References 

Named passenger trains of Japan
Night trains of Japan
Kyushu Railway Company
Railway services introduced in 1968
Railway services discontinued in 2008